Dún Laoghaire–Rathdown is a county in Ireland. It is part of the province of Leinster and the Eastern and Midland Region. It is one of three successor counties to County Dublin, which was disestablished in 1994. It is named after the former borough of Dún Laoghaire and the barony of Rathdown. Dún Laoghaire–Rathdown County Council is the local authority for the county. The population of the county was 218,018 at the time of the 2016 census.

Geography and subdivisions

Dún Laoghaire–Rathdown is bordered to the east by the Irish Sea, to the north by the city of Dublin, to the west by the county of South Dublin, and to the south by County Wicklow. With the city of Dublin, Fingal and South Dublin, it is one of four local government areas in the old County Dublin. Located to the south-east of the capital city of Dublin, the county town of Dún Laoghaire–Rathdown is Dún Laoghaire. Since 2015, the county in part of the Eastern and Midland Region. University College Dublin and Dún Laoghaire Institute of Art, Design and Technology are located in the county.

Towns, villages and suburbs

 Ballinteer
 Ballybrack
 Ballyogan
 Blackrock
 Booterstown
 Belfield
 Cabinteely
 Carrickmines
 Cherrywood
 Churchtown
 Clonskeagh
 Dalkey
 Deansgrange
 Dundrum
 Dún Laoghaire
 Foxrock
 Goatstown
 Glasthule
 Glenageary
 Glencullen
 Johnstown
 Killiney
 Kilmacud
 Kilternan
 Leopardstown
 Loughlinstown
 Monkstown
 Mount Merrion
 Rathfarnham
 Sandyford
 Sandycove
 Sallynoggin
 Shankill
 Stepaside
 Stillorgan
 Ticknock

Administrative history
In 1986, the administrative county of Dublin was divided into three "electoral counties": Dún Laoghaire–Rathdown, Dublin—Fingal, and Dublin—Belgard. The city has been administered separately from County Dublin since 1548. An "area committee" for the electoral county was formed within Dublin County Council under the Local Government Act 1991,

On 1 January 1994, County Dublin and the Borough of Dún Laoghaire were abolished and the three electoral counties became the administrative counties of Dún Laoghaire–Rathdown, Fingal, and South Dublin respectively. Dún Laoghaire–Rathdown comprises the former Borough of Dún Laoghaire and the south-eastern part of the former County Dublin. Additionally, the powers of the former Deansgrange Joint Burial Board were subsumed into the new authority. From 2002, all "administrative counties" in Ireland were redesignated as "counties". The three counties together with Dublin city constitute the old County Dublin.

Naming
The coastal town of Dún Laoghaire (called Dunleary until 1821 and then Kingstown until 1920) gave its name to the larger borough of Dún Laoghaire established in 1930. Rathdown was the south-easternmost barony in County Dublin, named after Rathdown Castle. When County Wicklow was created south of County Dublin in 1606, half of Rathdown was transferred to Wicklow, including Rathdown Castle, now a ruin. From the 1840s, the poor law union (PLU) of Rathdown covered all of the Wicklow barony and most of the Dublin barony, with part of Uppercross. From the Dublin and Wicklow sections of the PLU, the Local Government (Ireland) Act 1898 created rural districts respectively named Rathdown No. 1 and Rathdown No. 2, abolished in 1930 and 1925. Rathdown PLU survived as Rathdown Public Assistance District until 1960. Dún Laoghaire and Rathdown was a Dáil constituency created by the Electoral (Amendment) Act 1947 coterminous with the former Rathdown No. 1 rural district.

The name "Dún Laoghaire–Rathdown" was given to the electoral county created in 1985. Before its establishment as an administrative county, possible alternative names before deciding to retain "Dún Laoghaire–Rathdown". The 1993 act empowered Dún Laoghaire–Rathdown County Council (DLRCC) to apply to change the county's name, but this was not invoked.

However, in the Placenames Database of Ireland and the ministerial order under the Official Languages Act 2003, the name of the county in English is "Dún Laoghaire–Rathdown". This is followed by the County Council, with the  used in English.

The placenames order also distinguishes between the use of "County" as a prefix for the traditional counties, but not in the case of "Dún Laoghaire–Rathdown" and other counties listed as "administrative counties".

Local government and politics

Dún Laoghaire–Rathdown County Council is the local authority for the county. There are six local electoral areas (LEAs) for the county which return a total of 40 councillors as follows: Blackrock (6), Dundrum (7), Dún Laoghaire (7), Glencullen–Sandyford (7), Killiney–Shankill (7), and Stillorgan (6).

For elections to Dáil Éireann, the county is split between the Dáil constituencies of Dún Laoghaire (4 TDs) and Dublin Rathdown (3 TDs), with the division generally running along the N11. These constituencies currently have three Fine Gael TDs, two Green Party TDs, one Fianna Fáil TD and one People Before Profit–Solidarity TD.

It is part of the 4-seat Dublin constituency in European Parliament elections.

County motto
The motto on the insignia of the County Council reads, Irish for "From Harbour to Mountain". The crown in the device is that of Lóegaire mac Néill, a legendary 5th-century High King of Ireland and the eponymous Laoghaire of "Dún Laoghaire".

Demographics

Transport
The Dublin Area Rapid Transit (DART) system runs through the eastern coast of the county and connects to Dublin city centre to the north as well as other points north and south on the Iarnród Éireann railway system, with connections to Intercity trains. The green Luas line runs through the centre of the county.

There is a medium-sized harbour at Dún Laoghaire, with now discontinued ferry crossings to and from Holyhead in North Wales; this was a popular route for tourists travelling across the Irish Sea from Britain. This service was suspended indefinitely in September 2014.

Footnotes

References

External links

Dún Laoghaire–Rathdown County Council
Dún Laoghaire–Rathdown County Enterprise Board
Dún Laoghaire–Rathdown Tourism

 
Counties of the Republic of Ireland
County Dublin
Local government areas of the Republic of Ireland